Lave was an ironclad floating battery of the French Navy during the 19th century.

In the 1850s, the British and French navies deployed iron-armoured floating batteries as a supplement to the wooden steam battlefleet in the Crimean War. The role of the battery was to assist unarmoured mortar and gunboats bombarding shore fortifications.  The French used three of their ironclad batteries (Lave, Tonnante, and Dévastation) in 1855 against the defences at the Battle of Kinburn (1855) on the Black Sea, where they were effective against Russian shore defences. They would later be used again during the Italian war in the Adriatic in 1859.

The ships were flat-bottomed, and commonly nicknamed "soapboxes". They were towed from France to Crimea to participate in the conflict. Lave was towed by the paddle frigate Magellan.

References

Bibliography

 

1855 ships
Dévastation-class ironclad floating batteries
Ships built in France
Ironclad floating batteries
Crimean War naval ships of France